The men's 400 metres hurdles event at the 1963 Summer Universiade was held at the Estádio Olímpico Monumental in Porto Alegre with the final on 7 September 1963.

Medalists

Results

Heats

Final

References

Athletics at the 1963 Summer Universiade
1963